Manuscript paper (sometimes staff paper in U.S. English, or just music paper) is paper preprinted with staves ready for musical notation. A manuscript is made up of lines and spaces, and these lines and space have their names depending on the staves (bass or treble). Manuscript paper is also available for drum notation and guitar tabulature.

See also
 Rastrum
 Sheet music

Works Cited 
 “Staff Paper”. All About Music Theory. 10 Oct. 2014. Accessed 3 Apr. 2020.
 Sainsbury, Christopher. “Bi-tone Techniques and Notation in Contemporary Guitar Music Composition”. Master’s thesis, NSW Conservatorium of Music, 2001-2002.

External links
 The "Manuscript" Page — downloadable manuscript paper
 Music Paper — blank music papers in PostScript and PDF formats in Letter paper size

References

Musical notation
Stationery